Dionys van Nijmegen (1705 – 1798), was an 18th-century painter from the Northern Netherlands.

Biography

He was born in Rotterdam as the son of Elias van Nijmegen. He was a pupil of his father and Jacob de Wit and became a member of the Rotterdam Guild of St. Luke in 1743. He is known for portraits, wall and ceiling decorations.

He died in Rotterdam.

References

Dionys van Nijmegen on Artnet

1705 births
1798 deaths
18th-century Dutch painters
18th-century Dutch male artists
Dutch male painters
Painters from Rotterdam